Alyaksandr Kalatsey (born 27 January 1988) is a Belarusian former professional footballer.

Honours
BATE Borisov
Belarusian Premier League champion: 2007

External links

1988 births
Living people
Belarusian footballers
Association football midfielders
FC BATE Borisov players
FC Vitebsk players
FC Volna Pinsk players
FC Granit Mikashevichi players
FC Smolevichi players
FC Lokomotiv Gomel players